Baron Wilhelm Emmanuel von Ketteler (25 December 181113 July 1877) was a German theologian and politician who served as Bishop of Mainz. His social teachings became influential during the papacy of Leo XIII and his encyclical Rerum novarum.

Early life and ordination
Ketteler was born in Münster in Westphalia. In 1828 he finished the Matura in Brig, Switzerland far away from his home. He studied theology at Göttingen, Berlin, Heidelberg and Munich, and was ordained priest in 1844. He resolved to consecrate his life to maintaining the cause of the freedom of the Church from the control of the State. This brought him into collision with the civil power, an attitude which he maintained throughout a stormy and eventful life.

Scholar and politician
Ketteler was rather a man of action than a scholar, and he first distinguished himself as the deputy for District of Tecklenburg and Warendorf at the Frankfurt National Assembly, a position to which he was elected in 1848, and in which he soon became noted for his decision, foresight, energy and eloquence.

Bishop
In 1850 he was made bishop of Mainz, by order of the Vatican, in preference to the celebrated Professor Leopold Schmidt, of Gießen, whose Liberal sentiments were not agreeable to the Papal party. When elected, Ketteler refused to allow the students of theology in his diocese to attend lectures at Giessen, and ultimately founded an opposition seminary in the diocese of Mainz itself.

Educator
He also founded religious institutes of School Brothers and School Sisters, to work in the various educational agencies he had called into existence, and he labored to institute orphanages and rescue homes. In 1851, he founded the congregation of the Sisters of Divine Providence, with Stephanie Amelia Starkenfels de la Roche.

Death and legacy
He died at Burghausen, Upper Bavaria in 1877.

In Mainz, "Workers' Day" is celebrated in honor of the Bishop. The Herz-Jesu-Kirche, Mainz was built in the honour of Ketteler. The fuchsia cultivar "Baron de Ketteler" is named after him. Ketteler's nephew, Klemens von Ketteler, was Germany's envoy in China and was murdered during the Boxer Rebellion.

He is cited in Pope Benedict's encyclical Deus caritas est for his role in the Catholic social tradition.

Views
In 1861, Ketteler published a book on reconciliation between Catholics and Protestants in Germany, Freiheit, Autorität, und Kirche; in it, he proposed the founding of a prayer society "for the Reunion of Christendom". Ketteler was friends with Julie von Massow, a Lutheran woman from Prussian nobility, who indeed founded such a prayer society.

When the question of papal infallibility arose, he opposed the promulgation of the dogma on the ground that such promulgation was inopportune. But after the dogma was defined, he submitted to the decrees (in August 1870).

In 1858, Ketteler threw down the gauntlet against the State in his pamphlet on the rights of the Roman Catholic Church in Germany. In 1863 he adopted Ferdinand Lassalle's views and published his Die Arbeitfrage und das Christenthum. He was the strongest opponent of the State in the Kulturkampf provoked by Prince Otto von Bismarck after the publication of the Vatican decrees, and was largely instrumental in compelling that statesman to retract the pledge he had rashly given, never to "go to Canossa." To such an extent did Bishop von Ketteler carry his opposition, that in 1874 he forbade his clergy to take part in celebrating the anniversary of the Battle of Sedan, and declared the Rhine to be a "Catholic river."

Notes

References

External links 
A Catholic View of the Economy: Excerpt from Wilhelm Emmanuel von Ketteler’s “The Labor Question and Christianity” (1864)

1811 births
1877 deaths
People from Münster
People from the Province of Westphalia
Barons of Germany
Bishops of Mainz (1802-present)
Centre Party (Germany) politicians
Members of the Frankfurt Parliament
Members of the First Chamber of the Estates of the Grand Duchy of Hesse
Members of the 1st Reichstag of the German Empire
19th-century German Catholic theologians
19th-century German Roman Catholic bishops
19th-century German male writers
Participants in the First Vatican Council
University of Göttingen alumni
Humboldt University of Berlin alumni
Heidelberg University alumni
Ludwig Maximilian University of Munich alumni
German male non-fiction writers